Epia lunilinea is a moth in the family Bombycidae. It was described by William Schaus in 1920. It is found in Guyana.

References

Bombycidae
Moths described in 1920